Gurmana is a Kainji language of Gurmana village in Shiroro LGA, Niger State, Nigeria. There are no more than 2,000 to 3,000 speakers in Gurmana village and nearby hamlets.

References

Shiroro languages
Languages of Nigeria